Patricia "Pat" Chapman (born 21 July 1956) is a former Southampton WFC and England women's international footballer. She won 35 caps for England following her debut against Wales in 1976 and competed at the 1984 European Competition for Women's Football. In 1978 Chapman scored a record six goals in the FA Women's Cup final, in Southampton's 8–2 win over Queens Park Rangers.

Honours
Southampton
 Women's FA Cup: 1972–73, 1974–75, 1975–76, 1977–78

England
UEFA Women's Championship runner-up: 1984

References

Living people
English women's footballers
England women's international footballers
Women's association football midfielders
1956 births
Southampton Saints L.F.C. players
Footballers from Portsmouth
Southampton Women's F.C. players